Apart is a 2021 documentary film. The film follows three mothers as they return home after being released from jail where they spent time for drug charges.

References

External links
 Apart
 Official website

2021 documentary films